The Wales TUC is the co-ordinating body of trade unions in Wales. With 48 affiliated unions as of 2021, the Wales TUC represents nearly 400,000 workers.

Activities
The Wales TUC is an integral part of the Trades Union Congress (TUC) of England and Wales, and was set up to ensure that the role of the TUC is effectively undertaken in Wales. The Wales TUC aims to work with, and make representations to, other Welsh organisations. A major role is to co-ordinate the trade union approach to the Welsh Government and ensure that the interests of Welsh trade unionists are properly represented in the whole range of Senedd decision making. Wales TUC has responsibility over devolved matters in Wales. The General Secretary of the Wales TUC is Shavanah Taj (2021), who is based in the Cardiff office. Wales TUC develops policy on all devolved matters and others specific to Wales. Its General Council also oversees the implementation of UK wide or International matters agreed by the TUC's General Council.

The Wales TUC supports trade union reps in Wales through training and information on issues such as health & safety, workplace rights, learning at work, equalities climate change and just transition.

History
In 1982, The Wales TUC established the Wales Co-operative Centre to provide business support to co-operatives and to help redundant workers during the 1980s recession. The Centre is now the largest co-operative development body in the UK.

Leadership

General Secretaries
1974: George Wright
1984: David Jenkins
2004: Felicity Williams
2008: Martin Mansfield
2020: Shavanah Taj

Presidents

References

External links
Official website
Wales Co-operative Centre
Wales TUC Archive at the National Library of Wales

Trade unions established in 1974
National trade union centres of the United Kingdom
Trades Union Congress
Trades Union Congress
Trade unions in Wales